Michael Sigel (born July 11, 1953) is an American professional pool player nicknamed "Captain Hook."  He earned the nickname from his ability to hook his opponents with safety plays. Sigel was dominant during the 1980s in 9-Ball and Straight Pool and has a high run of 339 balls in Straight Pool. Mike Sigel is widely considered one of the greatest pool players of all time. In the year 2000, Sigel was voted "Greatest Living Player of the Century" by Billiards Digest Magazine.

Early life
Sigel is Jewish, and was born in Rochester, New York.  His mother Ruth was aggravated with him at times, because as she said "he wouldn't go to Hebrew school because he was too tired from playing pool nights."

Professional career
Sigel has won over 100 professional pool tournaments in his career, making him one of the most successful players of all time, winning multiple major titles in Straight pool and Nine-ball. Including 3 World Straight Pool Championship titles, 3 U.S. Open Nine-ball Championship titles and the BCA U.S. Open Straight Pool Championship.

Sigel turned pro in 1973 at the age of 21 years old. A few years later, Sigel continued the reputation as one of the best 9-Ball players in the country. 

By 1986, Sigel had won 63 out of the 68 professional tournament finals he had reached, earning himself the infamous nickname, "Mr. Finals".

He played himself in the movie Baltimore Bullet in 1980. He was also the technical advisor, instructor, and sports choreographer for most of the shots made by Paul Newman and Tom Cruise in the Academy Award-winning film The Color of Money in 1986.
Sigel was a dominant player in the 1980s and has been on the cover of numerous trade magazines such as Billiards Digest, Pool and Billiards, InsidePOOL, Billiard News, and Bike Week. He has been featured in Sports Illustrated, Life, People, NY Times, Wall Street Journal, USA Today, Playboy, Parade, Baltimore Magazine, Orlando Sentinel, Silver Screen, and Cigar Aficionado.

Sigel was named "Player of the Year" three times in 1981, 1983 and 1986 by Billiards Digest and Pool and Billiards Magazine.

In 2005, Sigel won the IPT 8-ball Exhibition Match, between him and Loree Jon Jones. The victory earned him $150,000. That same year, he was seeded in the final of the King of the Hill Eight-ball Shootout, the next event of the IPT. There he met Efren Reyes, who played his way through the tournament. In the match, Reyes defeated him and took home $200,000 and Sigel got $100,000 for second place.

Sigel maintains an official website, www.mikesigel.com.

Accolades
Sigel won the largest first place prize in a pool tournament at the time on three different occasions, winning $25,000 in 1979, $30,000 in 1981 and $40,000 in 1986. The only player to superseded this feat since in the modern era is Efren Reyes. 

In 1987, Sigel became the first player to earn over $100,000 in prize winnings in single year on the pro tour. In 1989, He became the youngest male to be inducted into the Billiard Congress of America Hall of Fame, at the age of 35. In 1994, Sigel became the first male pool player to win 100 professional tournaments in pocket billiards, at the age of 41.

Titles and achievements

Filmography
 1980 The Baltimore Bullet 
 1986 Color of Money (technical advisor) 
 1987 Mike Sigel's Winning Edge on Pocket Billiards 
 2000 The Art of Billiards

References

External links
 

American pool players
Sportspeople from Rochester, New York
Living people
1953 births
Jewish American sportspeople
21st-century American Jews